Carmine Dominick Giovinazzo (born August 24, 1973) is an American actor, writer, painter and musician, known for his role as Detective Danny Messer in CSI: NY.

Early life
Giovinazzo was born and raised in the Port Richmond neighborhood of Staten Island, New York, the son of Nancy and Dominick Giovinazzo. Growing up, Giovinazzo was an avid athlete. He graduated from Port Richmond High School in 1991 and attended Wagner College on a baseball scholarship. He had hoped to become a professional baseball player, but a serious back injury dashed his career plans; with the support of his family, he turned to acting. He studied acting at Wagner College and HB Studios, and spent four years working mostly non-paying roles in the New York area.

Career
In 1997, Giovinazzo moved to Los Angeles. Not long afterward, he successfully landed his first Hollywood role in the pilot of Buffy the Vampire Slayer, in which his character was the show's first on-screen victim. Afterwards, he appeared in numerous guest-starring roles on television and in film, including Billy's Hollywood Screen Kiss, For Love of the Game, The Big Brass Ring, and Black Hawk Down. He was also cast as one of the stars of the short-lived UPN sitcom Shasta McNasty, which was nominated for a Peoples Choice Award. Other films in which he had starring roles include In Enemy Hands with William H. Macy, and Players with Freddy Rodriguez and Peter Dobson. He played Tony Galper, the victim in the final episode of the TV series Columbo.

Giovinazzo was cast as forensic scientist Danny Messer on the hit TV series CSI: NY and is the first actor to appear in all three CSI series; his character was introduced in the CSI: Miami episode "MIA/NYC NonStop" (along with the other CSI: NY cast members), and he guest-starred in season three of the Las Vegas-based original series as street racer Thumpy G in the episode "Revenge is Best Served Cold" (though it is never specified that this guest spot was in any way related to his character on CSI: NY). Giovinazzo penned season six's vampire-themed episode "Sanguine Love", joining series leads Melina Kanakaredes and Gary Sinise who have also written episodes for the series.

In 2014, Giovinazzo portrayed the recurring role of Sid Markham in season two of the USA television series Graceland. In this series, he reunited with his former CSI: NY co-star Vanessa Ferlito.

Personal life
Giovinazzo plays the guitar, and writes songs and poetry. He is also a painter, mostly in oils, and one of his paintings appeared in the "Tri-Borough" episode of CSI: NY. He is currently a lead vocalist in the band Ceesau, which released one album, Era of the Exposed (2008). The song "Tear To Spare", from this album, was played in the CSI: NY sixth-season episode "Sanguine Love", which Giovinazzo wrote.

Giovinazzo is a cousin of Buddy Giovinazzo and Larry Romano.

Giovinazzo married actress Vanessa Marcil on July 11, 2010, in a private ceremony in New York City. Marcil filed for divorce in August 2012 on the basis of irreconcilable differences. The divorce was finalized in March 2013.

Filmography

References

External links

Carmine Giovinazzo at the CSI: NY Fan Wiki
Ceesau on Facebook

1973 births
20th-century American male actors
21st-century American male actors
American male film actors
American male television actors
American male video game actors
American people of English descent
American writers of Italian descent
American people of Norwegian descent
American television writers
Living people
Male actors from New York City
American male television writers
People from Staten Island
Wagner College alumni
Screenwriters from New York (state)
21st-century American singers
21st-century American male singers